Eaton Rapids Township is a civil township of Eaton County in the U.S. state of Michigan. The population was 3,821 at the 2000 United States Census.

Communities
 Kingsland is a small community 3 miles (5 km) ESE of Potterville.
 Petrieville is a small community 2 miles (3 km) NE of Eaton Rapids.
 The City of Eaton Rapids is located south of the township and is administratively autonomous.

Geography

Demographics
As of the 2000 United States Census, there were 3,821 people, 1,328 households, and 1,079 families in the township. The racial makeup of the township was 96.36% White, 0.60% African American, 0.58% Native American, 0.16% Asian, 0.81% from other races, and 1.49% from two or more races. Hispanic or Latino of any race were 2.46% of the population.

There were 1,328 households, out of which 40.4% had children under the age of 18 living with them, 71.5% were married couples living together, 6.3% had a female householder with no husband present, and 18.8% were non-families. 14.6% of all households were made up of individuals, and 4.3% had someone living alone who was 65 years of age or older. The average household size was 2.85 and the average family size was 3.15.

The township population contained 28.0% under the age of 18, 6.9% from 18 to 24, 30.3% from 25 to 44, 26.8% from 45 to 64, and 8.1% who were 65 years of age or older. The median age was 38 years. For every 100 females, there were 103.1 males. For every 100 females age 18 and over, there were 101.2 males.

The median income for a household in the township was $56,599, and the median income for a family was $58,947. Males had a median income of $41,341 versus $28,500 for females. The per capita income for the township was $21,000. About 1.6% of families and 3.2% of the population were below the poverty line, including 2.8% of those under age 18 and 4.1% of those age 65 or over.

References

Townships in Eaton County, Michigan
Lansing–East Lansing metropolitan area
Townships in Michigan